The Men's 100 metre breaststroke competition of the 2021 FINA World Swimming Championships (25 m) was held on 16 and 17 December 2021.

Records
Prior to the competition, the existing world and championship records were as follows.

The following new records were set during this competition:

Results

Heats
The heats were started on 16 December at 11:35.

Semifinals
The semifinals were started on 16 December at 19:06.

Final
The final was held on 17 December at 18:28.

References

Men's 100 metre backstroke